Steele Canyon Charter High School is a public charter high school located in the San Diego East County community of Spring Valley, California, United States. Opened in 2000, the school serves students in grades nine through grade twelve. It has operated as a California charter school since July 1, 2007. Steele Canyon's main rival is Valhalla High School. Steele Canyon has also served as an evacuation center for San Diego residents threatened by the Harris fire, one of the larger October 2007 California wildfires.

Athletics
Basketball coach Brad Leaf coached the Steele Canyon High School boys basketball team to a 30-2 record in 2004, and CIF San Diego Section boys basketball titles in 2004 and 2005.

Notable alumni
 Andrew Bellatti, baseball player for the Tampa Bay Rays
Nick Vogel, volleyball player
 Alex Vesia, baseball player for the Los Angeles Dodgers
Joel Quartuccio, singer for melodic post-hardcore band Being As An Ocean

Notable faculty
Brad Leaf, American-Israeli basketball player for Hapoel Galil Elyon and Maccabi Tel Aviv of the Israel Premier League, coach

See also

List of high schools in San Diego County, California
List of high schools in California

References

External links
 Official site

Educational institutions established in 2000
Charter high schools in California
High schools in San Diego County, California
2000 establishments in California